Idães is a civil parish in the municipality of Felgueiras, Portugal. The population in 2011 was 2,496, in an area of 7.11 km². The parish contains the town Barrosas.

References

Freguesias of Felgueiras